United States v. American Tobacco Company, was a decision by the United States Supreme Court, which held that the combination in this case is one in restraint of trade and an attempt to monopolize the business of tobacco in interstate commerce within the prohibitions of the Sherman Antitrust Act of 1890. As a result, the American Tobacco Company was split into four competitors.

Facts

Judgment
The Sherman Antitrust Act was created in 1890, and in 1907 the American Tobacco Company was indicted in violation of it.  In 1908 when the Department of Justice filed suit against the company, sixty-five companies and twenty-nine individuals were named in the suit.  The Supreme Court ordered the company to dissolve in 1911 on the same day that it ordered the Standard Oil Trust to dissolve.  The ruling in United States v. American Tobacco Co. stated that the combination of the tobacco companies "in and of itself, as well as each and all of the elements composing it whether corporate or individual, whether considered collectively or separately [was] in restraint of trade and an attempt to monopolize, and a monopolization within the first and second sections of the Anti-Trust Act."

Significance
In order to promote market competition, four firms were created from the American Tobacco Company's assets: American Tobacco Company, R. J. Reynolds, Liggett & Myers, and Lorillard.  The monopoly became an oligopoly.

In 1938 Thurman Arnold in the United States Department of Justice Antitrust Division began hosting hearings in the Temporary National Economic Committee to determine whether the four companies were further engaged together in monopolistic practices. That committee found that 3 of the 4 companies were guilty of the charges presented to the court.

See also
List of United States Supreme Court cases, volume 221
Standard Oil Co. of New Jersey v. United States (1911)

References

Further reading

External links

United States Supreme Court cases
United States Supreme Court cases of the White Court
United States antitrust case law
1911 in United States case law
United States tobacco case law